Sendapperuma Archchige Rasanjali Chandima de Alwis (born 26 November 1971) is a Sri Lankan former cricketer who played as a left-handed batter and right-arm medium bowler. She appeared in one Test match and 22 One Day Internationals for Sri Lanka between 1997 and 2000, including playing at the 1997 and 2000 World Cups. She played domestic cricket for Slimline Sports Club.

Silva later married Sri Lankan cricketer Guy de Alwis, becoming the second married couple to have both played Test cricket.

References

External links
 
 

1971 births
Living people
Sri Lankan women cricketers
Sri Lanka women Test cricketers
Sri Lanka women One Day International cricketers
Slimline Sport Club women cricketers
Sri Lanka women cricket captains